Scotland's Forgotten Valour is a 1995 book by Graham Ross, published by MacLean Press under . (The typography of the title on the book uses capitalisation to contrast emphasis ("SCOTLAND'S FORgotten VALOUR"), to communicate additional meaning, namely a reference to the For Valour inscription on the medal—and presumably the idea that valour is so much a part of the national character as to justify suggesting that "Scotland exists for the sake of valour".)

The book ... Valour presents the stories of the 158 Scottish-born Victoria Cross recipients prior to its going to press, out of the 1351 VCs that had then been awarded. It points out that five of the first ten Victoria Crosses awarded went to Scottish soldiers.

See also
Monuments to Courage (David Harvey, 1999)
The Register of the Victoria Cross (This England, 1997)

1995 non-fiction books
Victoria Cross books
Scottish non-fiction literature
 
History books about Scotland
1995 in Scotland